HMS Boscawan was a 70-gun third rate ship of the line of the Royal Navy, launched on 3 April 1844 at Woolwich Dockyard. She was originally ordered in 1812 and begun as a 74-gun Vengeur-class ship of the line, but the order was cancelled and her frames placed instorage; an Admiralty order dated 3 March 1834 required that those frames be reworked to Sir William Symonds' design. She was named for Admiral Edward Boscawen.

In 1873, Boscawen replaced Wellesley – the former  – as the training ship at Wellesley Nautical School and was herself renamed Wellesley.

On the afternoon of 11 March 1914, Wellesley was destroyed by fire and sank at her moorings on the River Tyne at North Shields. A total loss, she was broken up later in 1914.

Notes

References

Lavery, Brian (2003) The Ship of the Line - Volume 1: The development of the battlefleet 1650-1850. Conway Maritime Press. .

External links
 
British Pathe video of Wellesley (ex-Boscawen) burning on 11 March 1914

Ships of the line of the Royal Navy
Ships built in Woolwich
1844 ships
Crimean War naval ships of the United Kingdom
Ship fires
Shipwrecks of England
Maritime incidents in March 1914